Century Avenue is a major street in Pudong, Shanghai. It begins near the Oriental Pearl Tower and ends at Yanggao Road, in a pedestrianised section leading to Century Park.

Major Landmarks 
There are many major landmarks along the road (from west to east):

 Lujiazui 
 Jin Mao Tower
 Shanghai World Financial Center
 NYU Shanghai
 Shanghai Oriental Art Center
 Shanghai Science and Technology Museum
 Century Park

Metro stations
Shanghai Metro Line 2 follows Century Avenue for the entire length of the road. It is accessible through the following stations (from west to east):

 Lujiazui 
 Dongchang Road
 Century Avenue 
 Shanghai Science and Technology Museum

References

Pudong
Streets in Shanghai